Donald George Jackson,  (born April 2, 1940) is a Canadian retired figure skater. He is the 1962 World Champion, four-time Canadian national champion, and 1960 Olympic bronze medallist. At the 1962 World Figure Skating Championships in Prague, Czechoslovakia, he landed the first triple Lutz jump in international competition and won the world title.

Biography

Jackson was coached by Pierre Brunet in New York City, where he lived with the family of 1960 Olympic Champion Carol Heiss.

He won a bronze medal at the 1960 Winter Olympics at the age of 19.

In both 1959 and 1960, he won a silver medal at the World Championships. The 1961 event was cancelled after the tragic plane crash that claimed the lives of many of Jackson's contemporaries in the US figure skating team. He had not been scheduled to attend the championships that year and was luckily not on board the fatal flight. In 1962, at the World Championships in Prague, Czechoslovakia, Jackson became world champion and made history by landing the first triple Lutz in international competition.

He was inducted into Canada's Sports Hall of Fame in 1962, and the World Figure Skating Hall of Fame in 1977.

Jackson is the former director of skating and was also a coach at the Minto Skating Club in Ottawa, Ontario.

In 1997, he was made a Member of the Order of Canada. He was inducted into the Ontario Sports Hall of Fame in 2001.

In 2004, Jackson was included in the first induction of the Lisgar Collegiate Institute Athletic Wall of Fame, as part of the 160th Anniversary celebrations.

In 2012, he was made a member of the Order of Ontario.

In May 2016, aged 76 years old, Jackson appeared in a couple of Stars on Ice shows in Canada, performing a duet with Kurt Browning. His part included an Axel jump and a waltz jump.

Results

References

External links
Watch King of Blades, a 1965 National Film Board of Canada short film on Donald Jackson

1940 births
Canadian male single skaters
Figure skaters at the 1960 Winter Olympics
Living people
Lou Marsh Trophy winners
Members of the Order of Canada
Members of the Order of Ontario
Olympic bronze medalists for Canada
Sportspeople from Oshawa
Sportspeople from Ottawa
Olympic figure skaters of Canada
Olympic medalists in figure skating
World Figure Skating Championships medalists
Medalists at the 1960 Winter Olympics
Lisgar Collegiate Institute alumni
BBC Sports Personality World Sport Star of the Year winners
20th-century Canadian people
21st-century Canadian people